Melvira Oklamona (born 17 October 1993) is an Indonesian badminton player affiliated with Mutiara Cardinal Bandung who specializes in the doubles event.

Achievements

BWF International Challenge/Series 
Women's doubles

  BWF International Challenge tournament
  BWF International Series tournament

References 

1993 births
Living people
Indonesian female badminton players
21st-century Indonesian women
20th-century Indonesian women